The Point is a national historic district located at Plattsburgh, Clinton County, New York. It encompasses 33 contributing buildings and contains a collection of historic homes dating from about 1815. The district is adjacent to the historic D & H Railroad Complex and also Plattsburgh Bay, an arm of Lake Champlain. It is bounded by the railroad from the north, by Plattsburgh Bay from the east, and by the Saranac River, which separates it from downtown Plattsburgh, from the west.

The historic district was added to the National Register of Historic Places on November 12, 1982.

Gallery

See also
List of Registered Historic Places in Clinton County, New York

References

Historic districts on the National Register of Historic Places in New York (state)
Historic districts in Clinton County, New York
National Register of Historic Places in Clinton County, New York